Mervin P. Jackson, Jr. (August 15, 1946 – June 7, 2012) was an American professional basketball player.

Jackson was born in Savannah, Georgia and attended the University of Utah. A 6'3" guard, he played in the American Basketball Association from 1968 to 1973 as a member of the Los Angeles / Utah Stars and Memphis Tams. He won a league championship with Utah in 1971 and appeared in the 1969 ABA All-Star Game. In his ABA career, Jackson averaged 11.6 points per game.

Jackson was inducted into the Greater Savannah Athletic Hall of Fame in 1979. He died in June 2012.

References

1946 births
2012 deaths
All-American college men's basketball players
American men's basketball players
Basketball players from Savannah, Georgia
Guards (basketball)
Los Angeles Stars draft picks
Los Angeles Stars players
Memphis Tams players
Phoenix Suns draft picks
Utah Stars players
Utah Utes men's basketball players